Suzanne Voute (12 March 1922, Poitiers – 3 December 2001, Marseilles) was a militant Left Communist active in France from the 1940s. She became a member of the team, alongside Maximilien Rubel and Michel Jacob who translated much of the work of Karl Marx into French for Gallimard.

In 1942 she played a key role in organising the International Communist Left in Marseilles. However she soon came into conflict with Robert Salama and Marc Chirik. She worked with Ottorino Perrone writing the Appeal to all revolutionary militants which appeared in May 1945 and which led to the foundation of the Fraction Française de la Gauche Communiste Internationale (FFGCI) which also included a number of Italian refugees based in France. The group was linked to the Internationalist Communist Party which had just been founded.

References

2001 deaths
1922 births
Left communists
Marxologists